Nadine Rohanda Smith Wray Willow Benjamin  is a British lyric soprano.

Biography
She was born Nadine Rohanda Smith in Brixton, south London, of Jamaican-Indian heritage. Leaving school when she was 16, she joined the Youth Training Scheme, which led to her working with a corporate finance company in the City for seven years. Realising that she wanted to be a singer, she attended Tech Music School in west London, before deciding to focus on opera.

She was the recipient of a Voice of Black Opera Award for the most promising voice, and subsequently set up a mentoring agency called Everybody Can!

Benjamin was appointed Member of the Order of the British Empire (MBE) in the 2021 Birthday Honours for services to opera.

References

External links
 Official website
 "Black History Month: Nadine Benjamin, Soprano", Incorporated Society of Musicians.
 "A snapshot of British Soprano Nadine Benjamin's journey to opera - nadinebenjamin.com", YouTube video, 25 January 2016.
 Glover, Julian (24 September 2018), "Soprano Nadine Benjamin: 'I used to be naive about unconscious bias, but I can't any more'", Evening Standard.

Living people
English sopranos
English people of Jamaican descent
English people of Indian descent
Year of birth missing (living people)
Members of the Order of the British Empire